Kukës County is a landlocked county in northeastern Albania, with the capital in Kukës. The county spans  and had a total population of 74,388 people as of 2021. The county borders on the counties of Dibër, Lezhë and Shkodër and the countries of Montenegro, Kosovo and North Macedonia. It is divided into three municipalities: Has, Kukës and Tropojë. The municipalities are further subdivided into 290 towns and villages in total.

The human presence in the lands of modern Kukës County can be traced back to the Bronze Ages, when ancient Illyrians, Dardanians and Romans established settlements in the region. Several Illyrian tombs were discovered in the villages of Këneta and Kolsh close to Kukës.

Kukës is predominantly mountainous and framed by mountain ranges including the Albanian Alps in the northwest which is typified by karst topography. The northeast is dominated by the mountains of Gjallica, Koritnik and Pashtrik, while the southeastern bound is mostly formed by the Korab and Sharr Mountains. At , Maja Jezercë is the county's highest peak, and the second highest peak of Albania. Karst topography predominates in the county, resulting in specific landforms and hydrology because of the interaction of the karst and the region's watercourses. It is crossed and drained by the Drin river. The county is also home to the sources of rivers such as the Valbona which is part of Tropojë,originates south of Maja Jezercë and Gashi a notable tributary of Valbona.

Located in the north of Albania, the climate is alpine and continental.

According to the last national census from 2011 this county has 85,292 inhabitants. They are mostly Muslim and a significant Catholic Christian minority are present. They speak the Gheg dialect.

Geography 

Kukës is one of 12 counties of Albania, located in the north and northeast of the Northern Region. It is bordered by the counties of Shkodër County in the west, Dibër County in the south, Lezhë County in the southeast, the countries of Kosovo in the east and northeast and Montenegro in the north and northwest. Its northernmost point is Çerem point at 42° 29' 52" northern latitude; the southernmost is Kalis point at 41° 50' 0" northern latitude; the westernmost point is Rrogam at 19° 50' 24" eastern longitude; and the easternmost point is Shishtavec at 20° 36' 0" eastern longitude.

The terrain of the county consists of small plains and high mountains. The Albanian Alps are a high mountain range running through Tropojë across the northwest of the county. The northeast contain high and steep peaks including Gjallica, Koritnik and Pashtrik. Between these mountains are mostly narrow valleys, canyons and ravines. From southeast, the county is crossed by the Sharr and Korab Mountains.
 
Hydrologically, the county lies almost entirely within the basin of the Drin  and its tributaries. The river flows into the Adriatic Sea after crossing the county territory from the confluence of Black Drin and White Drin. On their way, its basin and zone of influence naturally correspond to the areas destined for agricultural use. Lake Fierza and Koman lies in the county and are fed and drained by rivers Black Drin and White Drin. Other notable rivers include Gashi and Valbona.

Phytogeographically, the county falls within the Dinaric Mountains mixed forests and Balkan mixed forests terrestrial ecoregions of the Palearctic temperate broadleaf and mixed forest. The Balkan mixed forests occupy the eastern portion of the county. Inside the county, there are a national parks, a nature park and a nature reserve, which include the Valbonë Valley National Park, Korab-Koritnik Nature Park and the Gashi River Nature Reserve. The northern and eastern bound of the county forms a part of the European Green Belt, which serves as a retreat for endangered mammal and plant species. Furthermore, the Gashi River was declared a UNESCO World Heritage Site as part of the Primeval beech forests of the Carpathians and other regions of Europe.

Demographics 

With an estimated total population of around 85,292 people as of the INSTAT census of 2011, Kukës is the second-to-last least populous county in Albania. Compared to 2001, the county had approximately 112,000 people. It has lost almost a quarter of its population in the last ten years. Kukës has the highest total fertility rate of Albania with 2.29 children per woman (compared to the national number of 1.54 children per woman).

The county is inhabited mostly by Albanians (99.15%) and is ethnically a homogeneous county in Albania. Minority groups include Macedonians (0.85%), Greeks (0.01%), Aromanians (0.01%) and Egyptians (0.00%).

According to the 2011 census, 83.81% of the Albanian population within the county identify as Muslims. Although Christianity is the second largest religion in Kukës. 2.72% identify themselves as Christians; of these, Roman Catholics make up the largest group, accounting for 2.62% of the population, after which follows Eastern Orthodoxy (0.03%), Evangelical or Protestant (0.03%), and other Christianity (0.04%).  0.33% of the population describes themselves as non-religious.

There has been a surge of tourists ever since the grand opening of Kukës International Airport Zayed in 2021.

Economy 
Kukës County is Albania's poorest region both historically and presently. Since the 1990s many of its inhabitants have migrated to Tirana or abroad. Prior to the collapse, Kukës industry was rug making, agriculture and textiles. However, since the 1990s much of Kukës population have migrated abroad, leaving to a decline in the local economy and making Kukës among Albania's and Europe's poorest regions and least developed. However, in 2021, Edi Rama opened up Albania's second international Airport in Kukës to revive the stagnant economy there. Nonetheless, Kukës remains three times poorer than the capital city of Tirana.

Gallery

See also 

 Geography of Albania
 Politics of Albania
 Divisions of Albania

Notes

References 

 

 
Counties of Albania